The Men's 100 metre freestyle event at the 2010 Commonwealth Games took place on 6 and 7 October 2010, at the SPM Swimming Pool Complex.

Seven heats were held, with most containing the maximum number of swimmers (eight). The heat in which a swimmer competed did not formally matter for advancement, as the swimmers with the top sixteen times advanced to the semifinals and the top eight times from there qualified for the finals.

Heats
The Heats started on 8:52 local time.

Heat 1

Heat 2

Heat 3

Heat 4

Heat 5

Heat 6

Heat 7

Semifinals

Semifinal 1

Semifinal 2

Final

See also 
2010 Commonwealth Games
Swimming at the 2010 Commonwealth Games

References

Aquatics at the 2010 Commonwealth Games